Red Point Provincial Park is a provincial park in Prince Edward Island, Canada. It is near the town of Souris and Basin Head Provincial Park.

References

Provincial parks of Prince Edward Island
Parks in Kings County, Prince Edward Island